Ama is a village in central-southern Bhutan. It is located in Wangdue Phodrang District.

See also 
List of cities, towns and villages in Bhutan

External links
Satellite map at Maplandia.com

Populated places in Bhutan